The 2005 IIHF World Championship Division I was an international ice hockey tournament run by the International Ice Hockey Federation.  The tournament was contested from April 17 to April 23, 2005. Participants in this tournament were separated into two separate tournament groups. The Group A tournament was contested in Debrecen, Hungary. Group B's games were played in Eindhoven, Netherlands. Norway and Italy finished atop of Group A and Group B respectively, gaining promotion to the Championship Division for 2006. While China finished last in Group A and Romania last in Group B and were relegated to Division II for 2006.

Participants

Group A

Group B

Group A tournament

Standings

Fixtures
All times local.

Scoring leaders
List shows the top ten skaters sorted by points, then goals.

Leading goaltenders
Only the top five goaltenders, based on save percentage, who have played 40% of their team's minutes are included in this list.

Group B tournament

Standings

Fixtures
All times local.

Scoring leaders
List shows the top ten skaters sorted by points, then goals.

Leading goaltenders
Only the top five goaltenders, based on save percentage, who have played 40% of their team's minutes are included in this list.

References

IIHF World Championship Division I
2
IIHF World Championship Division I
IIHF World Championship Division I
2005
International ice hockey competitions hosted by Hungary
IIHF World Championship Division I
Sports competitions in Eindhoven
21st century in Eindhoven
April 2005 sports events in Europe